Ferenc Kiss (16 April 1892 – 13 August 1978) was a Hungarian actor. He appeared in more than fifty films from 1921 to 1977.

Selected filmography

References

External links 

1892 births
1978 deaths
Hungarian male film actors